Edward Linde-Lubaszenko (born 23 August 1939) is a Polish actor.

Biography 
His father, Julian Linde, was a German of Swedish descent, who escaped from Białystok in 1939. Edward's mother, who was an ethnic Pole, refused to follow him to Germany. She met Mikołaj Lubaszenko, a Soviet officer with whom she moved to Arkhangelsk, where they got married. The young actor was raised as Edward Lubaszenko by his mother and her husband. He found that he was Linde's son when he was about 18 years old. He changed his name to Edward Linde-Lubaszenko in 1991.

Linde-Lubaszenko had his debut in 1964 at the Polish Theatre in Wrocław. In the 1960s he studied medicine but eventually graduated from Ludwik Solski Academy for the Dramatic Arts in Kraków in 1977.

Edward Linde-Lubaszenko was married four times. He is the father of the Polish actor Olaf Lubaszenko and Beata Linde-Lubaszenko.

References

1939 births
Living people
Actors from Białystok
Polish people of German descent
Polish people of Swedish descent
Polish male actors